Gehyra punctata, also known as the spotted dtella or the spotted gecko  is a species of gecko endemic to Western Australia.

References

Gehyra
Reptiles described in 1914
Geckos of Australia